Aref Gholampour (born 22 May 1999) is an Iranian football midfielder, who currently plays for Foolad in Persian Gulf Pro League.

References

1999 births
Living people
Iranian footballers
Association football midfielders
Esteghlal F.C. players
Foolad FC players
People from Izeh
Sportspeople from Khuzestan province